Remedios   is a corregimiento in Remedios District, Chiriquí Province, Panama. It is the seat of Remedios District. Its population as of 1990 was 2,650; its population as of 2000 was 962.

References

Corregimientos of Chiriquí Province